Bodo Hugo Hauser (23 February 1946 – 22 July 2004) was a German journalist and writer.

Life 
Hauser was born and died in Krefeld.

From 1968 to 1972 Hauser studied at University of Freiburg, at University of Lausanne and University of Bonn. Since 1973 Hauser worked for German broadcaster ZDF. Together with German journalist Ulrich Kienzle he was from 1993 to 2000 co-host of German talk-show Hauser and Kienzle on German broadcaster ZDF. Kienzle and Hauser were the "combattants" in the weekly ZDF political magazine Frontal, that always featured a controversial debate between the more leftist Kienzle (usually taking the position of the Social Democratic Party of Germany) and the more rightist Bodo Hauser (usually taking the position of the Christian Democratic Union of Germany). As a writer Hauser wrote several books. Hauser was married and had two children.

Hauser died by medical error.

Awards 
 1996: Bambi Award
 1997: Cross of the Order of Merit of the Federal Republic of Germany

Works

References 

1946 births
2004 deaths
German male journalists
German television journalists
20th-century German journalists
German male writers
University of Lausanne alumni
University of Bonn alumni
University of Freiburg alumni
Recipients of the Cross of the Order of Merit of the Federal Republic of Germany
People from Krefeld
ZDF people